Guillermo Alberto Santiago Lasso Mendoza (born 16 November 1955) is an Ecuadorian businessman, banker, writer and politician who has served as the 47th president of Ecuador since 24 May 2021. He is the country's first centre-right president in nearly two decades, marking a shift in the country's electorate.

Lasso served as Superminister of Economy during the Jamil Mahuad presidency briefly in 1999. He previously served as Governor of Guayas from 1998 until 1999. In 2003, he briefly served as the Itinerant Ambassador of Ecuador during the Lucio Gutiérrez administration. Aside from his political career, Lasso is also a banker and previously served as CEO of Banco Guayaquil. During the presidency of Rafael Correa, Lasso became a noted critic of his administration.

Lasso became involved in presidential politics when he founded the Creating Opportunities Party in 2012. He first ran for president in 2013; Lasso came in a distant second place behind President Correa, who won by a landslide. He would later run again in the 2017 election, where he advanced to the run-off running against former Vice President Lenin Moreno and narrowly lost the election winning 48.84% of the vote against Moreno's 51.16%. In his third presidential campaign in 2021, Lasso narrowly advanced to the April run-off round of the election in February and later was elected in April.

A liberal, his public agenda includes classical liberal points such as the defence of the division of powers to limit government and of fundamental rights. He has also expressed opinions in favour of lower taxes and is a free-market advocate.

Lasso's presidency has been noted for COVID-19 vaccination initiatives and economic relief packages through tax increases on the wealthy and funding with the International Monetary Fund. However, the increase of food and fuel prices, as well as his economic policies, culminated in a series of protests across the country. The government's response has raised concerns over human rights abuses, with crackdowns on indigenous protests at the hands of security forces, as well as alleged excessive force against journalists. Lasso's approval rating has dropped significantly throughout 2022.

Early life
Lasso was born in Guayaquil to a middle-class family in the Orellana neighborhood. His parents were Enrique Lasso Alvarado and Nora Mendoza. Lasso has ten siblings and his family lived with financial hardships. At age 15, Lasso would work to earn sufficient money to pay for his baccalaureate service at Colegio La Salle High School. After graduating from high school, he entered the Pontifical Catholic University of Ecuador in Quito to study economics but left without a degree.

In 1970, Lasso began working part-time at the Guayaquil Stock Exchange and later worked as a collection agency assistant at Casa Möeller Martínez. In 1972, he started working at the financial company Cofiec and then at Finansa in Quito. His first company was Constructora Alfa y Omega, founded with his older brother Enrique Lasso in 1978, when he was 23 years old.

In 1977, Lasso met María de Lourdes Alcívar, whom he would marry in 1980. They have five children: María de Lourdes, Juan, Guillermo Enrique, Santiago and María de las Mercedes.

Business career

During the 1990s, Lasso was named the head of operations in Ecuador for Coca-Cola, following the local bankruptcy of the company in that region. In this role, Lasso was tasked with restructuring the company and bringing it back to financial health. He has since sat on the boards of directors for both Coca-Cola and Mavesa, and also served as chairman of the board of directors of the Guayas Transit Commission as well as being a member of the Board of Directors of the Andean Development Corporation.

In 1994 Lasso became the CEO of Banco Guayaquil. As a part of his tenure, he founded the Bancos del Barrio program, a community banking initiative that brought in local shopkeepers as economic partners with the bank in planning and strategy. The program was cited by the Inter-American Development Bank as an advancement in grassroots banking penetration strategy. He resigned from his post as Executive President in 2012. Lasso is also the founder of the Fundacion del Barrio.

In March 2020, Lasso created the humanitarian initiative Saving Lives which was an initiative against the COVID-19 pandemic and raised 8 million dollars to help purchase medical supplies and equipment to the Ecuadorian Health System.

Political career

In 1998, Lasso was appointed as the Governor of Guayas, during which the national government underwent mass privatization of public companies and industries.

Ecuador went through an economic collapse in 1999, following which, Lasso was temporarily appointed to the newly created position of Superminister of the Economy, replacing the resigning Ana Lucía Armijos. As finance minister, he served under President Jamil Mahuad and took over negotiations with the International Monetary Fund for economic support. He was also tasked with coordinating government policy in response to the country's economic crisis.

In January 2003, President Lucio Gutiérrez named Lasso as the Ecuadorian Itinerant Ambassador, a position recently established. He would serve in this position until it was disestablished a few months later in April of that year. In anticipation of his first presidential campaign, Lasso founded the center-right party Creating Opportunities which outlined many policies against the Rafael Correa administration.

Early presidential campaigns

In the 2013 general election, he was the presidential candidate for the party Creating Opportunities. He landed in second place with 22.68% of valid votes, losing to incumbent President Rafael Correa who received more than double that amount (57.17%). Lasso is, through a trust named with his initials, GLM, the largest shareholder in Banco de Guayaquil, where he has been executive president for more than 20 years.

In early 2017, Lasso launched his second presidential campaign to succeed incumbent President Correa for the conservative Creating Opportunities party in the 2017 presidential elections. His campaign's theme was one of "change" and he pledged to create one million more jobs in Ecuador. Lasso received 48.84% and lost to Lenín Moreno. Following the result, Lasso accused his opponents of electoral fraud and called the incoming administration "illegitimate".

In February 2017, Lasso told The Guardian that should he win the presidential election he would "cordially ask" Julian Assange, the WikiLeaks founder, to leave the Ecuadorian Embassy in London within 30 days.

2021 general election

Lasso ran as a candidate again in the 2021 general election. He named neurosurgeon Alfredo Borrero as his running-mate in October 2020. In the first round, Lasso was slightly behind indigenous rights activist Yaku Pérez Guartambel but eventually garnered enough votes to secure a narrow second-place finish.

Following his first-round second-place finish, Lasso faced socialist and Rafael Correa ally Andrés Arauz. Arauz was considered to be the front-runner for the presidency and the "handpicked candidate" of former President Correa. In polling before the run-off, Arauz was leading Lasso with one indicating a 82% certainty of Arauz defeating Lasso. Lasso would defeat Arauz on 11 April in the run-off election, with many news outlets noting the conservative shift among the Ecuadorian electorate. Lasso won 52.4% of the vote, while Arauz won 47.6% of the vote. His victory was also seen as a win for free-market advocates in the country. Some news outlets described Lasso's win as an upset victory.

After his victory, President of Uruguay Luis Lacalle Pou became the first national leader to congratulate Lasso and wished that both Uruguay and Ecuador will "work together" upon his inauguration. President Sebastián Piñera, President Iván Duque Márquez and President Mario Abdo Benítez also congratulated Lasso. Both former President Mauricio Macri and President Felipe Calderón believed Lasso's victory would be beneficial to Ecuador and Latin America. In a statement released by the White House, President Joe Biden congratulated Lasso and Ecuadorian voters for "demonstrating the power of peaceful and inclusive political participation and upholding the ideals of democracy".

Presidency (2021–present)

Transition
After his election victory, bonds for Ecuador soared with many believing that under the Lasso administration, the country will uphold the International Monetary Fund (IMF). Lasso vowed to uphold a $6.5 billion financing agreement with the IMF and to keep payments on Ecuador's overseas bonds. Lasso also noted that his administration would focus on working with the United States, Chile, Brazil and Colombia while distancing from Cuba and Venezuela.

Addressing the Venezuelan presidential crisis, Lasso invited disputed President Juan Guaidó to his inauguration instead of President Nicolás Maduro. Lasso also announced that he will seek to regularize the situation of over 400,000 Venezuelan migrants living in Ecuador. While discussing the migration issue with Colombian President Iván Duque Marquez, Lasso said a possible option would be to grant Venezuelan migrants temporary protected status.

On 15 April, Lasso announced that on his first day in office, he will send a tax cut proposal to the National Assembly in which he will eliminate the 2% sales tax on micro-enterprises and the tax on foreign currency outflows. Lasso will try to lower the value-added tax within the economic incentive plan.

On 20 April, Lasso met with President Lenin Moreno to begin the transitional activities from the previous administration at the Carondelet Palace in Quito. Moreno vowed a transition of a "timely, transparent, truthful and technical manner". Lasso issued that his main priorities after being inaugurated would be to increase the COVID-19 vaccination rates in the country, vowing to vaccinate 9 million people within his first 100 days in office. He had talked to Chilean President Sebastian Piñera about obtaining loans to purchase vaccines with the support of the Inter-American Development Bank. Lassos said he aim for bilateral talks with Russia, China, the United States, the European Union and Chile to try to acquire vaccines.

On 27 April, Lasso named the first members of his cabinet, with women public servants dominating several political positions. He vowed that he would nominate as many women in his cabinet as "women must be in decision-making positions".

On 14 May, the Social Christian Party (PSC) announced that they would no longer support Lasso or his government for not "respecting" a legislative agreement with the Union for Hope Party (UNES) in the National Assembly. The PSC said that they felt that Lasso's government would "[leave out] the 47.5% of the Ecuadorians who voted for UNES or its 49 legislators". The Union for Hope Party is the opposition party during Lasso's administration. Five days later, he received credentials as Constitutional President of Ecuador in anticipation to his inauguration.

Tenure

2021

Lasso was inaugurated as the 47th president of Ecuador on 24 May 2021 at Carondelet Palace in Quito. Attendees of his inauguration include: Dominican President Luis Abinader, Brazilian President Jair Bolsonaro, U.S. Ambassador Michael J. Fitzpatrick, King Felipe VI of Spain, Haitian President Jovenel Moïse, Paraguayan Vice President Hugo Velázquez Moreno, Uruguayan Foreign Minister Francisco Bustillo, Spanish Opposition Leader, former Spanish Prime Minister José María Aznar, and former Colombian President Andrés Pastrana Arango. Lasso became the country's first center-right president since Gustavo Noboa, who served from 2000 to 2003.

Lasso vowed that in his first days in office, he would increase COVID vaccination numbers and promote oil production, mining and privatizations in the country. One of his first actions in office included expanding the Ministry of Sports and eliminating the debts of citizens who owed $1,000. He also named Vice President Alfredo Borrero as in charge of overhauling the country's healthcare system and COVID response.

He announced the privatization of three refineries, highways, the public telecommunications company and the Banco del Pacífico, as well as tax exemption for investments in the tourism sector for 30 years.

In June 2021, Lasso announced that Ecuador would launch a 100-day vaccine plan where he aimed to vaccinate 9 million people and to revive the economy. He announced that he would hold talks with Russia to purchase 18 million doses of the Sputnik V COVID-19 vaccine. He also said that the country had acquired over a million doses of the Pfizer–BioNTech and Oxford–AstraZeneca COVID-19 vaccine. Lasso urged the United Nations to ramp up vaccine rollouts in the country through their COVAX programme. In August 2021, while announcing the approval of a third shot for people with weakened immune systems, the Lasso administration announced that 4.8 million people received two doses of the vaccine with almost 10 million receiving one dose.

His administration is seen as a stark contrast towards other right-leaning governments in other South American countries. Despite his high approval rating, his political party has little to no impact on the National Assembly. His proposals to privatize state resources in the oil sector, expand mining and labor reform have received negative approval from the assembly. In August 2021, Lasso visited Mexican President Andres Manuel Lopez Obrador to discuss trade deals and for Ecuador to be admitted into the Pacific Alliance. That same month, he helped finalize an agreement that allows citizens of Ecuador, Colombia, Bolivia, and Peru to seek employment and live in any of the four countries without needing a special sponsorship.

In September 2021, Lasso announced an economic package where he proposed a tax increase for the country's wealthiest citizens. His plan would tax individuals who make more than $25,000 a year or about 3.5% of the country's working population. While addressing the United Nations General Assembly that same month, he announced that he was in talks with Russia about establishing a Sputnik V vaccine lab in Ecuador. He had also reached a $1.5 billion deal with the International Monetary Fund.

In September 2021, he announced the launch of the Creation of Opportunities Act (CREO), named after his political party, which includes tax reform and the easing of the labour code. The law calls for lowering the VAT on several products, eliminating the inheritance tax for children and spouses, eliminating the tax on small businesses, making hiring and working hours more flexible for new jobs, and creating free trade zones with tax incentives to attract foreign investment.

In September 2021, a massive protest was held in Quito against the Lasso administration with over 3,000 people in attendance. When a prison riot killed over 118 inmates at a prison in Guayaquil on 28 September, Lasso declared a state of emergency.

In October 2021, Lasso was named in the Pandora Papers leak where the International Consortium of Investigative Journalists (ICIJ) found that Lasso created an "offshore" framework to hide his actual net worth. In response to the leak, Lasso vowed to cooperate with the ICIJ and said that he had legally dissolved any assets or offshore accounts prior to the leak and that he has no association with any possible active accounts. Following the leak, an investigation by the country's Attorney General was launched against Lasso over potential tax fraud.

In October, 2021, communities from Ecuador's Amazon region sued over plans by President Guillermo Lasso to expand fossil fuel extraction and mining that they claimed threatens millions of acres of pristine rainforest and the survival of native peoples. The proposed expansion of extraction activities targets remote areas of the rainforest, habitat for what are claimed to be some of the highest levels of biodiversity on the planet.

On 19 October 2021, Lasso ordered a state of national emergency in Ecuador over the rise in drug-related violence in the country. This was also caused by the deadly Guayaquil prison riot that occurred weeks earlier. While ordering the mobilization of police forces, Lasso said that "armed forces and police will be felt with force in the streets because we are decreeing a state of emergency throughout the national territory". The 60-day state of emergency order would focus on cracking down of corrupt officials and drug trafficking.

In December 2021, a motion to impeach Lasso over what was revealed in the Pandora Papers was rejected by the National Assembly with 51 legislators in favor of the motion and 77 others against. A week later, Lasso announced the creation of a commission to investigate and end the rise in deadly prison riots and violence in the country.

2022

Following the Russian invasion of Ukraine in February 2022, Lasso said that Ecuador would support the position of the United Nations and the Organization of American States in condemning the invasion while labelling the invasion as "aggression", however, said that Ecuador has no plans to suspend diplomatic relations with Russia. That same month, Lasso visited Beijing and met with President Xi Jinping where they discussed a trade deal set for the end of the year and renegotiated debt talks.

In March 2022, Lasso expressed interest in running for re-election in the 2025 election.

A series of protests against the economic policies of Lasso, triggered by increasing fuel and food prices, began on 13 June 2022. Lasso was met with controversy after he suspended social media communication over the protests and allowed police officials to use deadly force against protestors. As a response to this, several members of the National Assembly condemned Lasso and called for his impeachment, with this process eventually starting on 28 June 2022 and concluded without the necessary number of assembly votes to oust him. Lasso had refused to commence peace talks with Indigenous protest leaders to end the protests, which also led to condemnation from assembly members and protest leaders.

2023 

A constitutional referendum was held on 5 February 2023, alongside the 2023 Ecuadorian local elections. Voters were asked to approve or reject a total of eight questions surrounding changes to the Constitution of Ecuador. Soon after the referendum, Reuters, Al Jazeera, CNN en Español and the Financial Times projected the failure of all eight of its proposals, with Lasso eventually conceding defeat.

Approval ratings
Lasso began his presidency with an approval rating of 71%, according to a CEDATOS survey in June 2021. In August 2021, a survey by Foreign Policy found his approval rating at a 73%. Foreign Policy noted his high approval rating was mainly due to his administration's response to the COVID-19 pandemic. The same poll found that 78% of Ecuadorians approved of his way of governing. In September 2021, Lasso was reported to have a 75% approval rating by Bloomberg News. Ratings have since dropped, as a May 2022 poll showed an approval of 38.5% and a 54.6% disapproval of Lasso.

Cabinet

Political positions

Lasso said that "life has made [him] liberal". However, when asked if he identified with that term, he replied that he does not place himself on any ideological ground, but believes in "good ideas". He responded in the same way when asked if he was from the right or the left. His public agenda includes classic liberal points such as the defense of the division of powers to limit government and of fundamental rights such as freedom of the press.

He has also expressed himself in favour of reducing taxes, state debt, and increasing the minimum wage with the announced aim of increasing productivity and employment in the private sector. On the tax on capital outflows, he thinks that it is a tax on capital income, and he has committed himself to eliminating at least nine taxes if he is elected president. Lasso also was accused of supporting reducing the minimum wage from $400 per month in 2020 to $120 per month; however, that was a statement taken out of context from an interview he gave in March 2020 in the middle of the pandemic, while suggesting letting businesses recruit unemployed poor single mothers so they could at least get some income.

Lasso has declared himself an admirer of José María Aznar's Silent Revolution, a series of reforms implemented by the former Prime Minister of Spain. On foreign trade, he has said that he favours a greater opening of trade with Ecuador's major partners, the United States and the European Union so that national producers have greater export opportunities.

Lasso was a supernumerary of Opus Dei. On abortion, he has said in general terms that he "believes in life from conception and that is a principle I will not change". In April 2021, when the Supreme Court ruled in favor of abortions in rape cases, Lasso said that he had "full respect" of the ruling and vowed to respect the separate political branches.

On other issues such as marriage between people of the same sex, he has said that he is in favour of allowing civil union but differentiating it from conventional marriage. On immigration, he has proposed controls for those with criminal records, but to facilitate the entry of foreigners for tourism, investment, or humanitarian reasons. On the decriminalisation of drugs, he maintains that a national debate is necessary to propose alternatives in the face of the failure of the war on drugs; on issues of environmental conservation, he states that he will keep the Yasuní Amazon reserve free of oil exploitation.

He also declares himself an enemy of the 21st-century socialism promoted from Venezuela and Cuba, whose Ecuadorian chapter identifies with the Citizens' Revolution led by Rafael Correa. Lasso has called ALBA a "third world empire". In response to his criticism of the Ecuadorian government's anti-capitalist discourse and measures, President Correa and other officials and members of Alianza PAIS have questioned Lasso by portraying him as a representative of the political forces that governed Ecuador before his party came to power in 2007, and pointing out that Lasso's tax proposals are irresponsible with the state budget. Also, President Rafael Correa claims Lasso had a hand in Ecuador's financial crisis of 1999.

In April 2022, during an official visit to Argentina, Lasso expressed his position in regards of the Falkland Islands sovereignty dispute, expressing support for Argentina's position, stating that "Ecuador supports Argentina's thesis regarding the Malvinas Islands" and that Ecuador will "always support Argentina in its claim".

Health
In 2018, Lasso underwent a surgical procedure on his spinal cord at the Cleveland Clinic in the United States following a back injury from a fall at a pilgrimage in Spain in 2013. The operation required him to use a forearm crutch since the operation. In June 2021, Lasso had a second spinal cord surgery in the United States to "regain regular leg mobility" in Miami, Florida.

In June 2022, Lasso was diagnosed with COVID-19.

In August 2022, Lasso announced that he was going to receive treatment for melanoma near his eye in the United States. He underwent surgery, which was successful, and returned to Quito to undergo further treatment.

Writing

In 2011, Lasso published the book Cartas a Mis Hijos, which translates to Letters to my Children, which contains lessons he developed from his time working in business and highlights recommendations for the economic development of Ecuador. Among his ideas, Lasso discusses the need for greater sovereignty over parts of the national economy. The book advocates for the Ecuadorian government to develop policies that create more economic opportunities for its citizens.

Soon after the release of Cartas a Mis Hijos, former Prime Minister of Spain José María Aznar stated the book held key insights into what is needed for development. During the book launch event, former Ecuadorian President Gustavo Noboa was present to show support for the project, along with other national politicians. Following its publications, Lasso performed policy speeches and used the plans in the book as a basis for a presidential political campaign.

In 2012, he then published the book Otro Ecuador Es Posible.

References

External links

Guillermo Lasso's personal page
Biography by CIDOB (in Spanish)

|-

|-

|-

1955 births
Presidents of Ecuador
Government ministers of Ecuador
Governors of Guayas Province
Living people
People from Guayaquil
Ecuadorian chief executives
Creating Opportunities politicians
People named in the Pandora Papers
21st-century Ecuadorian politicians